Panipat Thermal Power Station I is located at Khukhrana Panipat in Haryana. The power plant is one of the coal based power plants of HPGCL, It was formerly known as the Tau Devi Lal Thermal Power Station.

Power plant
The first four units was bifurcated from the total 8 units of the plant, so that to form Panipat Thermal Power Station I and II. Panipat Thermal Power Station I has an installed capacity of 447.80 MW. The First unit was commissioned in November 1979.
In order to improve the performance of the all four units of the plant, the Renovation and Modernisation has been started. The 3 cooling towers of this power plant was demolished in 2019.

Installed capacity

See also 

 Panipat Thermal Power Station II

References 

Coal-fired power stations in Haryana
Panipat district
Energy infrastructure completed in 1979
1979 establishments in Haryana
20th-century architecture in India